or  ("Fifteen Down") is an Austrian card game for two to five players that comes from the Salzburg area and is considered the quintessential game of the region. Although Mulatschak has been called the national card game of Salzburg, its rules were almost certainly unpublished before 2004. Mulatschak is a member of the Rams family in which the key feature is that players may choose to drop out of the game if they believe their hand is not strong enough to take a minimum number of tricks. There is a variant known as Murln or Murlen, which is played in Vienna and the Styria.

Background 
The word  is Hungarian in origin, meaning "merriment" or "amusement", and refers to the traditional evening drinks celebration where the glasses are hurled against the wall. The alternative name of  means "fifteen down".

Mulatschak is a member of the Rams family whose distinctive feature is that players may choose to opt out of a particular deal if they believe their cards are not sufficiently good to win a trick or the minimum specified number of tricks.

Geiser writes that Mulatschak "may justifiably be called the national card game of the state of Salzburg", because not only is it one of the most popular games in the Austrian state, especially among the young and middle-age groups, but it is rarely played anywhere else. It is thus quintessentially representative of Salzburg culture. However, no written records of the game have been found in Austria, Germany, or elsewhere, so Geiser believes his article marks the first time the rules have been published. This assertion was supported independently by McLeod in 2005.

Rules 
Mulatschak is usually played by 4 players who each start with a score of 15 points (Geiser) or 21 points (Murln). The following rules are based on Geiser.

Aim 
The aim is to win tricks in order to be the first to get one's score down to zero.

Cards 

Mulatschak is played with a Double German (William Tell) pack comprising four suits – Acorns, Leaves, Hearts and Bells – and 36 cards, ranking as follows: Sow (Deuce or Ace) > King >  >  > Ten > Nine > Eight > Seven > Six. The  is the permanent, second-highest trump card.

Dealing and cutting 
The dealer shuffles and offers the cards to rearhand to cut. Rearhand may peek at the bottom card of the top packet. Otherwise the remaining players may not see which card it is. The dealer then deals 5 cards to each player (4 to rearhand if he has  the ) in one packet of 3 cards and another of 2 cards. Any player with a 'whiteout' i.e. no court cards, declares it. The cards are then redealt and the next deal counts double.

Bidding 
Beginning with forehand, each player, in clockwise order, now announces the number of tricks they think they will win, from 0 to 5. Players must outbid the previous highest bid or "pass", apart from the dealer who may "hold" (by saying ) the highest bid. The winning bidder becomes the declarer and chooses the trump suit.

Exchanging 
The declarer then has the option of exchanging any number of cards from his hand with those from the talon. The way this is done is as follows: he places his card or cards, face down on the table and then receives the same number of cards from the dealer’s remaining stock. If he has discarded one card, he gets another 'on sight', i.e. face up, and may decide whether or not to exchange. If it is a trump and he exchanges it, he gets another card on sight and so on until a non-trump appears. The same procedure applies for 2 or more cards, his discarded cards forming a (face down) waste pile.

The remaining players then announce whether they will "play" or "stay at home". If they stay at home, they place their cards face down on the table and take no further part in the current deal. If they play, they may exchange as many cards as the dealer, as long as cards remain in the talon. Rearhand may not opt to stay at home, if all the others drop out.

There are 2 situations in which no-one may stay at home:
 Hearts are trumps
 Mulatschak is declared. In this case, no-one may exchange either.

Trick-taking 
The declarer leads to the first trick; thereafter the winner of a trick leads to the next. Players must follow suit and must head the trick if possible.

Scoring 
For each trick taken, one point is deducted ( or ) from the score. A summary of the point system is as follows:

 Every trick won – 1 minus point
  won – 10 minus points
 Stayed at home – 1 plus point
 No tricks – 5 plus points
 Declarer fails to achieve bid – 10 plus points
 Declarer fails to achieve  – 10 plus points; rest earn 10 minus points

If Hearts are trumps; all the above scores are doubled.

Anyone with 5 points or fewer may not stay at home i.e. they must play the game.  Anyone with 3 points or fewer may not exchange any cards.

The game may be played by 2 to 5 players; 3 to 4 being best. With 5 players, restrict exchanging or one sits out each time. A rubber comprises 2 or more deals.

The first dealer is chosen by lot. Players draw cards from the pack and the player with the highest card deals first. With 4 players, no more than 3 cards may be exchanged.

 is played from 21 points, not 15, and 'staying at home' costs 2 plus points, not one. Winning a  earns 10 points, but costs the others 20 plus points. Losing a  costs the declarer 20 points and the rest earn 10 minus points.

References

Literature 
 Geiser, Remigius (2004). "100 Kartenspiele des Landes Salzburg", in Talon, Issue 13, pp. 37 & 40.
 McLeod, John (2005). "Playing the Game: Schnellen, Hucklebuck and Donut" in The Playing-Card Journal Vol 30, No. 2, p. 288.

External links 
 Mulatschak FAQ by Charlie Jellinek. A Viennese variant. 
 Murln – denken und spielen Rules for Murln variant.

German deck card games
Austrian card games
Rams group
Salzburg (state)
Three-player card games
Four-player card games